Allansford railway station is a closed station in the town of Allansford, on the Warrnambool railway line in Victoria, Australia. The station was one of 35 closed to passenger traffic on 4 October 1981 as part of the New Deal timetable for country passengers.

References

Disused railway stations in Victoria (Australia)
Railway stations closed in 1981